Vladimir "Jamir" Salenga Garcia (5 September 1978 – 26 November 2020) was a Filipino musician best known as the main vocalist of the nu metal band, Slapshock.

Career

Slapshock
This band was formed during the University of the Philippines Fair on February 14, 1997, which marked their first-ever gig. By early 1998, original singer Reynold Munsayac left, and Garcia was soon afterward brought in to replace him. The band's name came from funky guitar plucking and chord slapping techniques that characterized much of the nu-metal sound. Rap-funk-punk-metal fusion band Red Hot Chili Peppers were a major influence. Guitarist Jerry Basco looked back at their debut album, 4th Degree Burn: "Our music that time were raw; we have little experience and knowledge about the equipment." Nonetheless, it was good enough for the fans. The album's sales reached platinum status. "We started at a young age and now we’ve matured. We evolved on our own. We don’t confine ourselves to what is the mode today," Garcia proudly claimed. But, though Slapshock continued to evolve, they remained true to their metal roots. In the recent wave of emo (emotive punk) bands, Nadela said: "We don’t see it as a competition; we have our own kind of music. We are more particular to rockers. It’s in the commitment. We stay long because we honor our commitment to the band. Other bands switch and change members maybe because their commitment is questionable." Ever since their formation, the members have refused to take any side projects or consider leaving the group. Kinse Kalibre, the title of their latest album under PolyEast Records, was released in 2011. The group produced the album themselves, perfecting musicality and peculiar arrangements. They received nominations such as Best Artist from MTV Asia, and were awarded Band of the Year by the NU107 in 2001, 2002, and 2003. They also received the Best in Album Packaging award for Novena in 2002.
Their first-ever hit "Agent Orange". Additionally, some of their songs are considered to be hardcore in style or genre.

Other works 

In 2012, Garcia and APL.DE.AP collaborated on the theme song for the movie El Presidente, which was an official entry in the 2012 Metro Manila Film Festival and won the Best Theme Song in the 2012 Metro Manila Film Festival.

In 2018, Garcia collaborated with the hip hop group "Chinese Mafia". with the song Laban; on the official soundtrack of the film We Will Not Die Tonight.

Social issues
Amid social struggles, Slapshock was very vocal and profound with its stance on issues facing Filipinos. "We get affected because we pay taxes to the government, then they can’t even protect us," Garcia complained.

Slapshock in Dubai
Slapshock performed at the Dubai Desert Rock Festival on March 7, 2008, together with internationally acclaimed bands such as Korn, Machine Head, Velvet Revolver, Muse and Marky Ramone (of The Ramones) and many others. Desert Rock was one of the largest rock events of its kind and the only one in the Middle East between 2004 and 2009, doubling its attendances yearly. "It was very fulfilling; we saw the bands that we idolize. We were inspired to write new materials. We became a band because of them," exclaimed vocalist Jamir Garcia. Though they sang a Tagalog song, overwhelming audience acceptance of their music was very visible. "The audience was mostly whites; it’s another inspiration that we can let foreigners jam with us. It’s a manifestation that music really transcends," bassist Lee Nadela attested. Slapshock had been invited not only to perform but also to record their first-ever international album.

Death
On November 26, 2020, Garcia died after committing suicide by hanging in Quezon City. He was brought to Metro North Medical Center and Hospital, where he was declared dead.

Discography

4th Degree Burn (PolyEast Records, 1999)
Headtrip (PolyEast Records, 2001)
Project 11-41 (PolyEast Records, 2002)
Novena (PolyEast Records, 2004)
Silence (PolyEast Records, 2006)
Cariño Brutal (PolyEast Records, 2009)
Kinse Kalibre (PolyEast Records, 2011)
Night Owls (BMBX, 2014)
Atake (BMBX, 2017)

References

External links
https://web.archive.org/web/20180317110940/https://www.slapshock.com/
https://web.archive.org/web/20080905074625/http://www.manilatimes.net/national/2008/may/13/yehey/life/20080513lif1.html
http://www.opm.org.ph/registry/artist_profile.php?artist_id=299
https://web.archive.org/web/20091219031318/http://burgerjam.deviantart.com/art/Jamir-Garcia-99448085

1978 births
2020 deaths
2020 suicides
21st-century Filipino male singers
Kapampangan people
People from Pampanga
People from Quezon City
Suicides by hanging
Nu metal singers
Suicides in the Philippines